How to Kill 400 Duponts is a 1967 Italian comedy film directed by Steno. The main character of the film, Dorellik, is a parody of the comic series Diabolik. The character was created in the late 60s for several sketches on television.

Plot
Dorellik, an Italian contract killer who lives on the French Riviera accepts a job to kill everyone named Dupont in France for a rich customer who expects to receive a large inheritance.

Cast 
Johnny Dorelli as Dorellik
Margaret Lee as Baby Eva
Alfred Adam as Inspector Saval
Terry-Thomas as Police Commissioner Green
Riccardo Garrone as Vladimiro Dupont
Rossella Como as Barbara Leduc
Didi Perego as Gisele Dupont
Agata Flori as Carlotta 
Piero Gerlini as Raphael Dupont
Totò Mignone as Berthold Dupont 
Samson Burke as Last Dupont

Production
How to Kill 400 Duponts was a film starring popular singer and television host Johnny Dorelli. The Italian title Arriva Dorellik made reference to Dorelli's character Dorellik, which premiered on his television show Johnny Sera.

Release
How to Kill 400 Duponts was released in Italy in 1967. Producer Dino De Laurentiis had been producing a film based on the Diabolik fumetti neri series and sued the producers of How to Kill 400 Duponts over their original title Dorellik, which led to the film being re-titled Arriva Dorellik ( Here Comes Dorellik) just before the film's release. Terry-Thomas, who played a starring role in Arriva Dorellik, also ended up guest-starring in De Laurentiis' Danger: Diabolik.

See also
 List of Italian films of 1967
 Terry-Thomas on screen, radio, stage and record

References

Footnotes

Sources

External links

1967 films
Italian comedy films
1967 comedy films
Italian superhero films
Films directed by Stefano Vanzina
Superhero comedy films
Films set in France
Films scored by Franco Pisano
1960s Italian films